Lee Ha-rim (born 27 June 1997) is a South Korean judoka.

He is the bronze medallist of the 2018 Asian Games in the -60 kg category.

References

External links
 

1997 births
Living people
South Korean male judoka
Judoka at the 2018 Asian Games
Asian Games bronze medalists for South Korea
Asian Games medalists in judo
Medalists at the 2018 Asian Games
People from Yeongcheon
Sportspeople from North Gyeongsang Province
21st-century South Korean people